The eleven-striped blind snake (Epictia undecimstriata) is a species of snake in the family Leptotyphlopidae.

References

Epictia
Reptiles of Bolivia
Reptiles described in 1839